Benedetto Della Vedova (Sondrio, 3 April 1962) is an Italian politician.

A keen pro-Europeanist, Della Vedova is currently president of Forza Europa (FE) and has been secretary of More Europe (+EU), the latter comprising FE and the Italian Radicals. He has held public office multiple times.

Biography
Della Vedova, a long-time Radical, started to be active in politics in 1994, when he followed Marco Pannella, founder and leader of the Radical Party and the Transnational Radical Party, into the Pannella List, of which he was briefly secretary.

During his career, Della Vedova was member of the European Parliament for the Bonino List (1999–2004) – the electoral successor of the Pannella List –, candidate for President of Lombardy (2000), president of the Italian Radicals (2001–2003), founder and president of the Liberal Reformers (2005–2009) – which was then re-booted as Libertiamo –, member of the Chamber of Deputies for Forza Italia (2006–2008), The People of Freedom (2008–2011) and Future and Freedom (2011–2013), member of the Senate for Future and Freedom (2013), Civic Choice (2013–2015) and the Mixed Group (2015–2018), and under-secretary at the Ministry of Foreign Affairs in Renzi Cabinet (2014–2016) and Gentiloni Cabinet (2016–2018).

More specifically, from 2001 to 2003 Della Vedova was president of the Italian Radicals, a party launched after the defeat of the Bonino List in the 2001 general election. In 2003 he was the strongest challenger to Daniele Capezzone for the leadership of the party, on a platform based on free-market economic liberalism and the hidden proposal of joining Silvio Berlusconi's centre-right House of Freedoms coalition, but was soundly defeated. In 2005 he left the Italian Radicals, which, under the leadership of Pannella, Bonino and Capezzone, had decided to join forces with the Italian Democratic Socialists in the Rose in the Fist and support Romano Prodi and his centre-left The Union, and launched the Liberal Reformers.

In the 2006 general election Della Vedova was elected to the Chamber of Deputies on the list of Forza Italia, Berlusconi's party and dominant force in the House of Freedoms. Re-elected to the Chamber in the 2008 general election, he later distanced from Berlusconi and the centre-right, joined Future and Freedom, was elected senator in the 2013 general election, switched to Civic Choice and was appointed in centre-left governments led by Democratic Prime Ministers.

In 2017 Della Vedova launched Forza Europa and later, in the run-up of the 2018 general election, he was a founding member of More Europe, part of the centre-left coalition. Having been defeated in the single-seat constituency of Prato, Tuscany, he was appointed coordinator of More Europe. In January 2019 he was elected secretary at the party's founding congress.

On 1 March 2021 he has been appointed Undersecretary at the Ministry of Foreign Affairs and International Cooperation in the Draghi Cabinet.

References

External links
Personal website

1962 births
Living people
People from the Province of Sondrio
Italian Radicals politicians
Liberal Reformers politicians
The People of Freedom politicians
Future and Freedom politicians
Civic Choice politicians
Deputies of Legislature XV of Italy
Deputies of Legislature XVI of Italy
Senators of Legislature XVII of Italy
Politicians of Lombardy
Italian libertarians
Italian Radicals MEPs
MEPs for Italy 1999–2004
Bocconi University alumni